Enkhjargal Dandarvaanchig (born 1968, Ulaanbaatar), also known as Epi, is a Mongolian musician, overtone singer, and Morin khuur player. He works in the style of fusion between modern and traditional music.

Discography 
 2002: Hoirr öngoö, Solo
2010:  Violons Barbares, with Violons Barbares
2014: Saulem Ai, with Violons Barbares
2016: Crazy Horse, with Mathias Duplessy
 2017: Souffles des steppes, with Henri Tournier
2018: Wolf's Cry, with Violons Barbares
2019: Setgeliin gunii tsuurai, Solo

References

Mongolian musicians
1968 births
Living people
21st-century Mongolian male singers